Mbule, also called Dumbule or Mbola, is an endangered Southern Bantoid language spoken by a few people in central Cameroon.

The language is spoken in Mbola village in the South Bokito commune, Mbam-et-Inoubou department of the Centre Region, Cameroon.
As reported in 2009, there were just 110 speakers of the language, none of whom were monolingual.

References

Further reading

Mbam languages
Languages of Cameroon